Purainia is a village in West Champaran district in the Indian state of Bihar.

Demographics
As of 2011 India census, Purainia had a population of 3538 in 653 households. Males constitute 51.75% of the population and females 48.24%. Purainia has an average literacy rate of 48.9%, lower than the national average of 74%: male literacy is 62%, and female literacy is 37.9%. In Purainia, 21.6% of the population is under 6 years of age.

References

Villages in West Champaran district